Triazene is an unsaturated inorganic compound having the chemical formula N3H3. It has one double bond and is the second-simplest member of the azene class of hydronitrogen compounds, after diimide. Triazenes are a class of organic compounds containing the functional group -N(H)-N=N-. Triazene, possibly along with its isomer triimide (HNNHNH), has been synthesized in electron-irradiated ices of ammonia and ammonia/dinitrogen and detected in the gas phase after sublimation.

References

External links
IUPAC Gold Book definition

Nitrogen hydrides